Macrocypraea zebra, common name the measled cowrie, is a species of sea snail, a cowry, a marine gastropod mollusk in the family Cypraeidae, the cowries.

Subspecies
Macrocypraea zebra dissimilis, Schilder, Franz Alfred, 1924

Description

The shape is usually long oval, the dorsum surface is smooth and shiny, the basic color is brown, usually with three wide dark brown trasversal bands and several white-bluish spots and a light gray longitudinal mark on the top ('sulcus'). On the sides the white spots become ocellated, showing a small dark brown spots on the center. The base of Macrocypraea zebra shell is pale brown and the long and narrow aperture usually bears long dark brown labial teeth. The interior of the shell may be purple. Macrocypraea zebra is quite similar to Macrocypraea cervus and Macrocypraea cervinetta, but it can be easily distinguished on side view by the presence of mentioned ocellated spots, that are missing in the last two species.  In the living cowries of Macrocypraea zebra the mantle is greyish, with short sensorial papillae.  The mantle may cover the entire shell and can be withdrawn into the shell opening when the cowry is threatened.

Distribution
This species is distributed in the Atlantic Ocean along North Carolina, Florida and in the Caribbean Sea, the Gulf of Mexico, the West Indies and Brazil.

Habitat
They live in tropical low intertidal and in subtidal waters, usually on coral reef or under rocks. Minimum recorded depth is 0 m. Maximum recorded depth is 37 m.

References

 Rosenberg, G., F. Moretzsohn, and E. F. García. 2009. Gastropoda (Mollusca) of the Gulf of Mexico, Pp. 579–699 in Felder, D.L. and D.K. Camp (eds.), Gulf of Mexico–Origins, Waters, and Biota. Biodiversity. Texas A&M Press, College Station, Texas

External links

Cypraeidae
Gastropods described in 1758
Taxa named by Carl Linnaeus